Listrocerum murphyi is a species of beetle in the family Cerambycidae. It was described by Adlbauer in 2004. It is known from Malawi.

References

Dorcaschematini
Beetles described in 2004